Fernando Gómez Martínez (1 March 1897 – 5 December 1985) was a moderate Colombian Conservative Party member, newspaper editor, former Governor of Antioquia Department, and Foreign Minister.

References 

Foreign ministers of Colombia
Colombian Ministers of Government
Governors of Antioquia Department
Colombian Conservative Party politicians
Colombian journalists
Male journalists
Mayors of Medellín
1897 births
1985 deaths
20th-century journalists